Tiruvottiyur railway station is one of the railway station of the Chennai Central–Gummidipoondi section of the Chennai Suburban Railway Network. It serves the neighbourhood of Tiruvottiyur, a suburb of Chennai, and is located 9 km north of Chennai Central railway station. It has an elevation of 7 m above sea level.

History
The lines at the station were electrified on 13 April 1979, with the electrification of the Chennai Central–Gummidipoondi section.

Services
Daily regular EMU services are available up to Gummidipoondi, Sullurpeta, Ennore in the north and Chennai central in the south. In addition, rare daily rails are available up to Chennai beach, Tiruvallur, Velachery, Tambaram and Chengalpattu.

Traffic
Approximately 25,000 people use the station every day.

See also

 Chennai Suburban Railway
 Railway stations in Chennai
 Tiruvottiyur

References

External links
 Tiruvottiyur station at Indiarailinfo.com

Stations of Chennai Suburban Railway
Railway stations in Chennai